The 2014–15 season in Primera División de Nicaragua will be divided into two tournaments (Apertura and Clausura) and will determine the 65th and 66th champions in the history of the league. It will also provide the sole berth for the 2015–16 CONCACAF Champions League. The Apertura tournament will be played in the second half of 2014, while the Clausura will be played in the first half of 2015.

Teams

A total of 10 teams will contest the league, including 8 sides from the 2013–14 season and one sides directly promoted from the 2013–14 Segunda division. The final participant will be determined in a two-legged play-off, in which the 9th placed Primera division side FC San Marcos will play the team who finished second in Segunda division which was Fox Villa. Fox Villa won 2-0 over FC San Marcos gaining promotion.

 ART Jalapa
 Diriangén FC
 UCEM Juventus FC
 Managua F.C.
 Deportivo Ocotal
 Real Madriz
 Real Esteli F.C.
 Fox Villa (Winner of the relegation/promotion playoff)
 UNAN Managua (Winner of the Segunda Division)
 Walter Ferretti

Promotion and relegation
 At the end of the 2013–14, UNAN Managua and Fox Villa were promoted to Primera Division
 At the end of the 2013–14, Chinandega FC and FC San Marcos were relegated to Segunda Division.

Changes
 Juventus Managua changed their name and will now be known as UCEM Juventus FC []

Stadiums and locations

Team information
Last updated: 2014

Personnel and sponsoring (2014 Apertura)

Managerial changes

Before the season

During the season

Apertura
The 2014 Apertura was the first tournament of the season. It began on 2014.

Regular season
The regular season began on 2014. The top four finishers will move on to the next stage of the competition.

Standings

Results

Positions by round

Playoffs

Semi-finals

First leg

Second leg

Walter Ferretti won 2-0 on aggregate.

Real Esteli won 3-2 on aggregate.

Finals

First leg

Second leg

 Walter Ferretti won 1–0 on aggregate score.

Season statistics

Top scorers

Updated to games played on 30 December 2014

Scoring

First goal of the season:  Katzumichi Ikeda for Juventus Managua against Fox Villa, 12 minutes (25 July 2014)
Fastest goal in a match: TBD minute -  TBD for TBD against TBD ( 2014)
Goal scored at the latest point in a match: 88 minutes -  Rene Ruiz for Fox Villa against Juventus Managua (25 July 2014) &  Emiro Gomez for Deportivo Ocotal against Real Esteli F.C. (26 July 2014) 
First penalty goal of the season:  Mitchell Willams for UNAN Managua against Managua F.C., 28 minutes (27 July 2014)
Widest winning margin: 3 goals
Juventus Managua 5–2 Fox Villa (25 July 2014) & Deportivo Walter Ferretti 3–0 Real Madriz (26 July 2014)
First hat-trick of the season: TBD for TBD against TBD (2014)
First own goal of the season: TBD (TBD) for TBD (2014)
Most goals in a match: 7 Goals Juventus Managua 5–2 Fox Villa (25 July 2014)
Most goals by one team in a match: 5 Goals
Juventus Managua 5–2 Fox Villa (25 July 2014)
Most goals in one half by one team: 3 Goals Juventus Managua 5–2 Fox Villa (25 July 2014)
Most goals scored by losing team: 2 Goals
Fox Villa 2–5 Juventus Managua (25 July 2014)
Most goals by one player in a single match: 2 Goals
 Rene Ruiz for Fox Villa against Juventus Managua (25 July 2014) &  Samuel Wilson for Real Esteli F.C. against Deportivo Ocotal (26 July 2014)

Top scorers

List of foreign players in the league
This is a list of foreign players in Apertura 2014. The following players:
have played at least one apertura game for the respective club.
have not been capped for the Nicaragua national football team on any level, independently from the birthplace

A new rule was introduced this year, that clubs can only have five foreign players in a squad.

ART Jalapa
  Luis Maradiaga
  Erling Ruiz 
  Arlis Lizandro Andino
  Juan José Tablada

UNAN Managua
  Herberth Cabrera
  Michael William
  Giacomo Ratto
  George Tinglin
  Jhonatan Donado Cardale
  Carlos William Rovira Terán

Diriangén FC
  Jose Luis Rodriguez
   Saul Tyler Varela Fragoso
  Moisés Raúl Leguías
  Armando Cruz
  Camilo Quiñónez
  Jesús Guerrero

Juventus Managua
  Anderson Palacio
  Jonathan Angelo Castillo
  Allan Maralles
  Kazumichi Ikeda

Managua
  Luis Fernándo Gonzáles
  Oscar Palomino
  Jeffry Araica
  Darwing Güity
  Keysi Guerrero

 (player released mid season)

Ocotal
  Marcos Alfredo Rivera
  Cristhian Dario Batis
  Nerlin Vallejos
  Evanisto de Jesus Gonzales
  Emiro Manuel Gomez
  Yitson Rafael Lameda

Real Esteli
  Rodrigo Valiente
  Andres Camilo Ramìrez 
  Allan Kardeck
  Jefferson Geraldo De Almeida
  Daniel Da Silva
  Eduardo Praes

Real Madriz
  Ramón Eloy Iriarte 
  Marlon Barrios
  Ornaldo José Torre
  Jose Luis Cassiani
  Jafeth Kaleth Valencia
  Luis Valladares

Fox Villa
   Marvin Lamber

Walter Ferretti
  Luis Fernando Copete
  Dani Cadena
  Bernardo Laureiro
  Deiver Cañate 
  Erick Alcazar

Clausura
The 2015 Clausura was the first tournament of the season. It began on 2015.

Team information
Last updated: 2014

Personnel and sponsoring (2014 Apertura)

Managerial Changes

Before the season

During the season

Regular season
The regular season began on 2015. The top four finishers will move on to the next stage of the competition.

Standings

Results

Positions by round

Playoffs

Semi-finals

First leg

Second leg

Diriangen won 2-0 on aggregate.

Real Esteli won 3-2 on aggregate.

Finals

First leg

Second leg

 Real Esteli F.C. won 2–1 on aggregate score.

List of foreign players in the league
This is a list of foreign players in Clausura 2015. The following players:
have played at least one apertura game for the respective club.
have not been capped for the Nicaragua national football team on any level, independently from the birthplace

A new rule was introduced this year, that clubs can only have five foreign players in a squad.

ART Jalapa
  Luis Maradiaga
  Erling Ruiz 
  Arlis Lizandro Andino
  Juan José Tablada
  Mario Borja

UNAN Managua
  Herberth Cabrera
  Michael William
  George Tinglin
  Freider Mattos Pombo
  Rodrigo Hernández Martínez
  Luis Murillo

Diriangén FC
  Lucas Martella
  Jose Luis Rodriguez
  Jesús Guerrero
  Edwin Mejia
  Brandon Mena
  Camilo Quiñonez

Juventus Managua
  Anderson Palacio
  Roland Quintero
  Ronny Colón
  Cesar Salandía
  Rudy Williams

Managua
  Luis Fernándo Gonzáles
  Oscar Palomino
  Jeffry Araica
  Darwing Güity
  Keysi Guerrero

 (player released mid season)

Ocotal
  Marcos Alfredo Rivera
  Alexander Trimiñio Motta
  Miguel Montalvo
  Evanisto de Jesus Gonzales
  Emiro Manuel Gomez
  Yitson Rafael Lameda

Real Esteli
  Devis Gutiérrez
  Vinicius De Sousa
  Jesus Valencia
  Óscar Movil
  Gabriel Martínez 
  Miguel Ángel Lavié

Real Madriz
  Miguel Estrada
  Marlon Barrios
  Luis Valladares
  Adin Barahona
  José Antonio Julio Carballo
  Grevin Antonio Cerrato

Fox Villa
   Alex Piache
   Hugo Zambrano
   Alberto García 
   Jamie Romo
   Roel Salinas

Walter Ferretti
  Bernardo Laureiro
  Erick Alcazar 
  Eder Munive
  Maycon Santana
  Carlos Conceição Junior
  Gonzalo Ancheta

Championship playoff

First leg

Second leg

 Walter Ferretti won 2–1 on aggregate score.

Aggregate table

References

External links
 https://int.soccerway.com/national/nicaragua/1a-division/2013-2014/apertura/

Nicaraguan Primera División seasons
1
Nicaragua